Parophidion is a genus of cusk-eels found in the Atlantic Ocean and the Mediterranean Sea.

Species
There are currently two recognized species in this genus:
 Parophidion schmidti (Woods & Kanazawa, 1951) (Dusky cusk-eel) - western Atlantic Bermuda to northern South America.
 Parophidion vassali (A. Risso, 1810) - Mediterranean and adjacent areas of the eastern Atlantic.

References

Ophidiidae